Çağlayan is a municipality (belde) in the Erzincan District, Erzincan Province, Turkey. The village is populated by Kurds of the Abasan and Balan tribes and had a population of 1,699 in 2021. It is divided into the neighborhoods of Atatürk, Cumhuriyet, Derebağ, Erdene, Mertekli, Şelale and Yamaçlı.

References 

Kurdish settlements in Erzincan Province

Towns in Turkey
Populated places in Erzincan Province